The Calcinara is a river in southeastern Sicily in Italy. It flows into the Anapo near the archaeological site of Pantalica.

References 

Rivers of the Province of Syracuse
Rivers of Italy
Drainage basins of the Ionian Sea